South Street Historic District is a national historic district located at Cuba in Allegany County, New York. It encompasses the village of Cuba's most distinguished residential enclave. The structures date from about 1840 to about 1938-1939 and reflect a variety of popular architectural styles. The district consists of 37 residential properties dating from 1840 to 1940 and three churches : First Baptist and Christ Episcopal, 1871, and Our Lady of Angels Roman Catholic, 1926. The district begins at the First Baptist Church and ends at the railroad underpass at the south end.

It was listed on the National Register of Historic Places in 1988.

References

Historic districts on the National Register of Historic Places in New York (state)
Historic districts in Allegany County, New York
National Register of Historic Places in Allegany County, New York
1840 establishments in New York (state)